Several vessels during the Age of sail were named Golden Grove, possibly for Golden Grove, Jamaica, or Golden Grove, Carmarthenshire:
 was launched in 1780 as Russian Trader, and renamed Golden Grove in 1782. She was a supply ship with the First Fleet transporting convicts to Botany Bay. She was last listed circa 1811.
 was launched at Teighnmouth in 1786 as a West Indiaman, and apparently immediately sailed to the West Indies. She first entered Lloyd's Register in 1793 with Tobagonian ownership. She then became a London-based West Indiaman. A Spanish privateer captured her in 1805, but the British Royal Navy recaptured her within months. She then returned to the West Indian trade. After 1810 she apparently started sailing between London and Dublin. She was lost c.1821. 
, was launched at Southampton in 1783, but probably under another name. In 1794 she was a slave ship. Under new ownership she wrecked in late 1795.

Ship names